Serge Ferreira (born 11 August 1959) is a French athlete. He competed in the men's pole vault at the 1984 Summer Olympics.

References

1959 births
Living people
Athletes (track and field) at the 1984 Summer Olympics
French male pole vaulters
Olympic athletes of France
Place of birth missing (living people)